Mary River National Park is an Australian national park located about  east and stretching to the southeast of Darwin in the Northern Territory.

Geography
Mary River National Park incorporates the following areas, some of which are not contiguous to each other. The park consists of four non-contiguous parts:

 Alligator Lagoon Conservation Area
 Annaburroo Delta Block Conservation Area
 Boggy Springs Conservation Area
 Jimmy's Creek Conservation Area
 Mary River Conservation Reserve
 Mary River Crossing Conservation Area
 McKinlay River Conservation Area
 Opium Creek Conservation Area
 Point Stuart Coastal Reserve
 Shady Camp Conservation Area
 Stuarts Tree Historical Reserve
 Swim Creek Conservation Area
 Wildman River Conservation Area

Overview

The Mary River National Park consists of a collection of small reserve areas which protects part of the Mary River catchment.

The Mary River is one of eight rivers in the Top End that have large floodplains in their catchments. The Arnhem Highway crosses five of these eight rivers as one travels between Darwin and Jabiru.

This Park is located 150 km east of Darwin along the Arnhem Highway.

In the Dry Season, from May to September, most areas are accessible to all vehicles, however many roads are unsealed. During the Wet Season, from October to April, flooding can cause road closures.

Recreational activities

The Mary River Crossing on the Arnhem Highway 3 km west of the Bark Hut Inn has picnic areas, toilets and a boat ramp to make this an ideal site to access the Mary River system. Camping is not permitted at the Mary River Crossing.

Rockhole is another popular access point to the waterways of the Mary River. A boat ramp and picnic facilities are located here, where Barramundi fishing is popular.

Couzen's Lookout camping area offers secluded camping beside the Mary River. It is only a short walk to the lookout where the sunsets are stunning.

Brian Creek Monsoon Forest is a patch of diverse monsoon forest that contrasts strongly with the surrounding woodlands. This is easily accessible.

Shady Camp is a popular fishing spot with boat ramps, picnic areas and toilets. A viewing platform offers excellent views of the river and its many crocodiles upstream. A barrage helps prevent saltwater entering the freshwater wetlands. Camping is permitted and fees apply.

Mistake Billabong has a shaded viewing platform where visitors can watch life on the billabong.

Point Stuart is the historic location where John McDouall Stuart's exploring expedition reached the sea in 1862 after riding over 2,000 miles north to traverse the continent. It is open during the drier months of the year.

See also
Protected areas of the Northern Territory
Wildman River Wilderness Work Camp

References

External links
Mary River National ParkNatural Resources, Environment, The Arts and Sport; Northern Territory Government. Accessed on 10 May 2012.
 Parks and Wildlife Commission NT
Official map of Mary River National Park

National parks of the Northern Territory